Eriochlamys is a genus of Australian flowering plants in the family Asteraceae.

Species
 Eriochlamys behrii Sond. & F.Muell. – New South Wales, Queensland, Victoria, Northern Territory, Western Australia, South Australia
 Eriochlamys cupularis N.G.Walsh – South Australia
 Eriochlamys eremaea N.G.Walsh – Northern Territory, Western Australia, South Australia
 Eriochlamys squamata N.G.Walsh – Victoria

References

Gnaphalieae
Endemic flora of Australia
Asteraceae genera
Taxa named by Otto Wilhelm Sonder
Taxa named by Ferdinand von Mueller